Alice Lougee Hagemeyer (born 1934) is a deaf American librarian who worked to make libraries more accessible for deaf people. She graduated from Gallaudet University in 1957. From 1957 to 1991 she worked for the District of Columbia Public Library. In 1974 she created Deaf Awareness Week, later called Deaf Heritage Week, in which programs about deaf culture are held in libraries. She became the District of Columbia Public Library's first full-time "Librarian for the Deaf Community" in 1976. Also in 1976, she earned a master's degree in Library Science from the University of Maryland. In 1979 she began The Red Notebook, which was a binder of information by and about deaf people for the Martin Luther King Memorial Library. In 2001 the information went online, on a website called "The Red Notebook." In 1980 she founded the unit now known as the Library Service to People who are Deaf or Hard of Hearing Forum, which is a unit within the American Library Association. In 1986 she co-founded Friends of Libraries for Deaf Action, which became an official section of the National Association of the Deaf in 1992. She was also the chair of the National Association of the Deaf Ad Hoc Committee on National Deaf History Month and began the push to have March 13 to April 15 recognized as National Deaf History Month in the United States. In 2006 the American Library Association and the National Association of the Deaf declared that they would recognize that time as National Deaf History Month.

She received the National Association for the Deaf's President's Award in 1980, was recognized as one of the University of Maryland's College of Information Studies' Distinguished Alumni in 1987, and was granted Honorary Membership in the American Library Association in 2007. Also in 2007 she was named Deaf Person of the Month for August by DeafPeople.com.

She is the author of Deaf Awareness Handbook for Public Librarians, and The Public Library Talks To You (a handbook for deaf people who use public libraries.) In 1992 in her article "We Have Come a Long Way", published in Library Trends, she describes characteristics of deaf people and ways libraries can develop policies and services that provide accessibility to the deaf community.

References

Further reading

External links
 The Red Notebook website

1934 births
American librarians
American women librarians
American deaf people
Gallaudet University alumni
Living people
Place of birth missing (living people)
Writers from Washington, D.C.
21st-century American women